St. Cloud Times is an American, English language daily newspaper headquartered in St. Cloud, Minnesota. The Times is owned by mass media holding company Gannett and is part of the USA Today network of newspapers. The print version of the paper is printed by ECM Publishers in Princeton, Minnesota.

History
The St. Cloud Times and Journal Press was created in 1929 through the merger of several local newspapers, including the St. Cloud Union, The Visitor, St. Cloud Democrat, St. Cloud Journal-Press, and German Language Der Nordstern. The paper was renamed to the St. Cloud Daily Times in 1941, becoming a six-day a week afternoon paper owned by Fred Schilplin. The newspaper was purchased by Speidel Newspapers in 1975, which in turn was purchased by Gannett, the largest newspaper holding company in the United States, in 1977. The Times added a Sunday edition in 1988.  

The St. Cloud Journal-Press had previously been known as the "St. Cloud Journal"

St. Cloud was also home to the Minnesota Union newspaper, founded by Sylvanus Lowry, a slave owner from Kentucky, Democratic political boss, and the city's first council president (the office of mayor did not exist) to compete with Radical Republican Jane Swisshelm's Saint Cloud Visiter and to provide a pro-slavery viewpoint. Lowry lived in St. Cloud in 1854 until his death in 1865. Swisshelm left St. Cloud when the Civil War broke out in 1861.

Award Winning Journalism and Photography
In 2016, the Times published an in-depth look at immigration in central Minnesota that was named "Story of the Year" by the Minnesota Society of Professional Journalists. "In its prime, the paper had 40 to 50 people in its newsroom covering three counties and beyond, regularly winning state and even national journalism awards."

Decline and Downsizing
Parent company Gannett cut newsroom reporter and editing staff to the point that only a single newspaper reporter remained in 2022 covering Minnesota's fifth largest metropolitan area, with a population of 200,000. Local news was replaced by stories from Gannett's national USA Today, local sports coverage, once supported by a staff of 10, was eliminated. The local paper had no coverage of St. Cloud State University's hockey team, ranked number one in the nation.  Industry observers referred to the shell publication as a 'Ghost Paper'.

Axios (website) asked Gannett in December 2022 how the barebones St. Cloud staff can keep producing a daily paper. The email response: "While incredibly difficult, implementing these efficiencies and responding decisively to the ongoing macroeconomic volatility will continue to propel Gannett's future,"  

In January 2023, the last remaining news reporter at the paper resigned, to join a new daily free online publication produced by The Forum Communications Company, headquartered in Fargo North Dakota, 155 miles northwest of St. Cloud by Interstate 94.

Forum Chief Content Office Mary Jo Hotzler said: "St. Cloud, from a geographical standpoint, makes sense. But more than that, we are deeply committed to local journalism and see a need in St. Cloud."  

In 2022, Gannett ended newspaper delivery of the Times, distributing the paper through the U.S. Mail instead, eliminating a separate Saturday edition and delivering the Sunday paper on Saturday instead.

Online Digital 
The newspaper's website, sctimes.com, was established in 1998., and refers to the publication as the "SC Times".  The publication offers readers a 'digital only' option.

References

External links
Official website

Newspapers published in Minnesota
1861 establishments in Minnesota
Newspapers established in 1861
St. Cloud, Minnesota